Mystic Challenge is a game show that aired on Living from 2000. It was hosted by Paul Ross.

References

External links
 Mystic Challenge at UKgameshows.com

2000s British game shows
2000 British television series debuts
2000 British television series endings